Dark Shadows: The Rage Beneath is a Big Finish Productions audio drama based on the long-running American horror soap opera series Dark Shadows.

Four original series cast members reprise their roles -- David Selby as Quentin Collins, Lara Parker as Angelique, John Karlen as Willie Loomis, and Kathryn Leigh Scott as Maggie Evans.

The cast also includes Robert Rodan, who played Adam in the original series, and Jamison Selby, David Selby's son.

Plot 
As a storm rages across Collinsport, ancient forces are stirring throughout the town. The waters of the ocean hold dark secrets for the Collins family - secrets that must be revealed once and for all. As a malevolent power takes hold, Quentin Collins finds himself facing a final confrontation...

Cast
Quentin Collins – David Selby
Angelique – Lara Parker
Willie Loomis – John Karlen
Maggie Evans – Kathryn Leigh Scott
Barnabas Collins – Andrew Collins
Oswald Gravenor – Robert Rodan
Ed Griffin – Jamison Selby
Susan Griffin – Ursula Burton

External links
- Dark Shadows: The Rage Beneath

Rage Beneath
2007 audio plays